Demoso Township is a township of Loikaw District in the eastern part of Kayah State in Myanmar.

The principal town lies at Demoso.

Townships of Kayah State